The following are the football (soccer) events of the year 1906 throughout the world.

Events
2 March : Deportivo de La Coruña is founded.
1 July : Portuguese Club, Sporting CP is founded.
10 October : Spezia Calcio is founded.
3 December : Torino is founded.

Winners club national championship 

 Italy: A.C. Milan
 Greece: Ethnikos G.S. Athens (First Greek Champion
 Paraguay: Club Guaraní
 England: Liverpool F.C.
Scotland: For fuller coverage, see 1905-06 in Scottish football.
Scottish Division One – Celtic
Scottish Division Two – Leith Athletic
Scottish Cup – Hearts

International tournaments
1906 British Home Championship (27 February – 7 April 1906)
Shared by  &

Births
 1 May – Fernando Giudicelli, Brazilian international footballer (died 1968)
 30 July – Alexis Thépot, French international footballer (died 1989)
 8 October – Hans Stubb, German international footballer (died 1973)
 14 December – Clifford Heap, English professional footballer (died 1984)

Deaths

Clubs founded
 Deportivo de La Coruña
 Maccabi Tel Aviv F.C.
 RC Lens
 Spezia Calcio
 Sporting CP
 Terrassa FC
 Torino FC
 Neftçi PFK

References 

 
Association football by year